A ceramic filter is a device made of ceramics, used for some form of filtering or separation process. It may refer to either 

 Separation
 Ceramic water filter, a fine-pored filter used for purifying water
 Vacuum ceramic filter, an improved rotary vacuum-drum filter, using a ceramic filtering element to remove water or solvent from slurries so as to extract solids
 Diesel particulate filter, a ceramic device for cleaning small particles from the exhaust of diesel engines

 Electronics 
'Filtering' is the process of separating a signal by frequency, see electronic filter
 Ceramic filter is based on ceramic resonators, which is a piezoelectric ceramic element that has a narrow response to a particular frequency
 Crystal filter, a similar device, using quartz crystals
 SAW filter, a ceramic filter using a surface acoustic wave, rather than bulk material effects
 FBAR or TFBAR filters are based on thin-film bulk acoustic resonators, utilising BAW (bulk acoustic wave) effects and manufactured by thin-film methods